Roger Roland Verey (14 March 1912 – 6 September 2000) was a Polish rower who competed in the 1936 Summer Olympics.

He was born in Lausanne, Switzerland and died in Kraków. In 1936 he won the bronze medal with his partner Jerzy Ustupski in the double sculls competition rowing at the 1936 Summer Olympics. In 1939 he was runner-up in the Diamond Challenge Sculls at Henley Royal Regatta to Joe Burk.

References

External links
 profile 

1912 births
2000 deaths
Polish male rowers
Olympic rowers of Poland
Rowers at the 1936 Summer Olympics
Olympic bronze medalists for Poland
Olympic medalists in rowing
Sportspeople from Lausanne
Medalists at the 1936 Summer Olympics
Burials at Rakowicki Cemetery
European Rowing Championships medalists
Swiss emigrants to Poland